Dhaka Central Jail was the largest jail in Bangladesh, located in the old section of Dhaka, the country's capital. The jail has been used to house criminals as well as political prisoners, especially during the Language Movement of 1952, the 6 Point Movement, and the Bangladesh Liberation War. However, the jail earned infamy after the killings of four political leaders — A. H. M. Qamaruzzaman, Tajuddin Ahmad, Syed Nazrul Islam and Captain Muhammad Mansur Ali — on the eve of a military counter-coup on November 3, 1975 against the regime of president Khondaker Mostaq Ahmad and army chief Ziaur Rahman, which had seized power on August 15 after the assassination of Sheikh Mujibur Rahman. The slain leaders are mourned by many supporters in Bangladesh today, with the date informally known as "Jail killing day."

History
Before British rule, there was a Mughal fort at the site of the current jail. During the early years of the 19th century, the fort was renovated, and converted into a jail. Until 1836, the Kotowali Police station was also co-located here. Records from 1833 show that the capacity of the jail at that time was 800 inmates. However, the jail had an average of 526 inmates every day. The Dhaka jail was converted into the central jail for East Bengal.

The jail has been shifted to the new Dhaka Central Jail, Keraniganj in July, 2016. A park and two museums are planned to be set up on the nine-acre area of the old jail complex.

References

Old Dhaka
Buildings and structures in Dhaka
Mughal architecture
History of Dhaka
Forts in Bangladesh
Prisons in Bangladesh
1788 establishments in British India

hi:सेल्यूलर जेल
id:Penjara Cellular
kn:ಕೋಶೀಯ ಸೆರೆಮನೆ (ಸೆಲ್ಯುಲರ್ ಜೈಲ್)
nn:Cellular-fengselet
ta:சிற்றறைச் சிறை